Colonel Sir George Ashley Maude,  (11 November 1817 – 31 May 1894) was a British Army officer and Crown Equerry to Queen Victoria.

Biography
Colonel Sir George Ashley Maude was born in 1817, the son of Rev Hon. John Charles Maude of Enniskillen, Ireland and Mary Cely Trevilian, daughter of William Cely Trevilian. His paternal grandparents were Cornwallis Maude, 1st Viscount Hawarden and his third wife, Anne Isabella Monck, sister of 1st Viscount Monck.

Sir George was educated at the public school Sherborne and entered the Royal Horse Artillery in 1834, which he later commanded as Colonel. He served in the battles of Alma and Balaklava, and took part in the Siege of Sebastopol.

As Lieutenant-Colonel he was Military Assistant to the Mission to the Coronation of Czar Alexander II of Russia, 7 September 1856, led by Lord Granville. He was Deputy-Inspector to the Royal Irish Constabulary between 1858 and 1859, and appointed Crown Equerry of the Royal Mews in the Royal Household of the Sovereign of the United Kingdom in 1859.

He was appointed Knight Commander of the Order of the Bath (KCB) in 1887.

Family
In 1845 Colonel Sir George Ashley Maude married Katherine Katinka, youngest daughter of Charles Beauclerk of St Leonard's Lodge, Horsham, Sussex. Through her father, Katherine was the granddaughter of Lady Diana Spencer (b1734), daughter of Lt-General Charles Spencer, 3rd Duke of Marlborough. Sir George and Lady Maude had six sons and one daughter. He died in 1894.

Their children were:

Emily Diana Frances (c. 1846-23 Sep. 1926), married Jonathan Peel Baird, son of Sir David Baird, 2nd Baronet. They had nine children.
Charles John (17 March 1847-29 Apr. 1910), who married Sarah Maria Pell, daughter of Adm. Sir Watkin Owen Pell of Sywell. They had a son, and two daughters.
Comm. Eustace Downman (31 Aug. 1848-12 June 1930), who married Amy Williams, and had issue of which their oldest, Ruth, married son Sir Salusbury Gillies Payne, 5th Baronet.
Ashley Henry (14 March 1850-3 Oct. 1933), married Emma Constance Henry and had issue.
Lt.-Col. Aubrey Maurice (1 Aug. 1852-2 Jan. 1943), who married Amy Florence Lucas, sister of Sir Arthur Lucas, 2nd Baronet. They had two children, Brig. Christian George and Nancy of which the former married the Hon. Patience, daughter of George Kemp, 1st Baron Rochdale, and secondly Hester, granddaughter of Edward Egerton MP. Both marriages produced children. 
Maj. Alwyne Edward (23 July 1854-1 Dec. 1945), married twice to Katharine Lucy Campbell (d. 1892) and Louise Caroline Silfestrom. He had issue with Katharine.
Frederick William (28 Feb. 1857-9 Feb. 1923), Baron of the Cinque Ports. He married Ellen Maud Kelk, daughter of Sir John Kelk, 1st Baronet. They had issue.

References

1817 births
1894 deaths
People educated at Sherborne School
Knights Commander of the Order of the Bath
Maude family
Royal Artillery officers